The Friedland was an 80-gun Bucentaure-class ship of the line of the French Navy, designed by Sané.

Career 
Her launching was attended by Napoleon and his wife, Marie Louise. She was commissioned in Antwerp under Captain Le Bozec on 4 January 1811, and attributed to the Brest squadron.

She was given to Holland with the Treaty of Fontainebleau of 1814.

References

Bibliography 

1810 ships
Bucentaure-class ships of the line
Ships built in France
Ships of the line of the French Navy